Zeki Ayvaz (born 1 October 1989) is a Turkish footballer who plays as a goalkeeper for TFF Third League club Muş 1984 Muşspor.

External links
 
 
 

1989 births
Sportspeople from Trabzon
Living people
Turkish footballers
Turkey youth international footballers
Association football goalkeepers
Trabzonspor footballers
1461 Trabzon footballers
Balıkesirspor footballers
Akhisarspor footballers
Kartalspor footballers
Denizlispor footballers
Ankara Demirspor footballers
Tarsus Idman Yurdu footballers
Gümüşhanespor footballers
Süper Lig players
TFF First League players
TFF Second League players
TFF Third League players